is a town located in Nagano Prefecture, Japan. , the town had an estimated population of 25,051 in 9737 households, and a population density of 290 persons per km².

Geography
Minowa is located in the Ina Valley of south-central Nagano Prefecture, bordered by the Kiso Mountains to the north. The Tenryū River flows through the town. Minowa Dam is located in the town.

Climate
The town has a climate characterized by characterized by hot and humid summers, and cold winters (Köppen climate classification Cfa).  The average annual temperature in Minowa is 11.4 °C. The average annual rainfall is 1342 mm with September as the wettest month. The temperatures are highest on average in August, at around 24.3 °C, and lowest in January, at around -1.0 °C.

Surrounding municipalities
Nagano Prefecture
 Ina
 Suwa
 Minamiminowa
 Tatsuno

Demographics 
Per Japanese census data, the population of Minowa has recently plateaued after several decades of growth.

History
The area of present-day Minowa was part of ancient Shinano Province. The villages of Nakaminowa, Minowa and Higashiminowa were established on April 1, 1889 by the establishment of the modern municipalities system, Nakaminowa was elevated to town status on November 3, 1948. Nakaminowa, Minowa and Higashiminowa merged to form the town of Minowa on January 1, 1955.

Education
Minowa has five public elementary schools and one public middle school operated by the town government, and one high school operated the Nagano Prefectural Board of Education.

International schools
 Nagano Nippaku Gakuen (former Colégio Pitágoras) - Brazilian school

Transportation

Railway
 Central Japan Railway Company -  Iida Line
 -  -

Highway
  Chūō Expressway

Notable people from Minowa, Nagano
 Manabu Soya, Japanese professional wrestler

References

External links

Official Website 

 
Towns in Nagano Prefecture